The Frisk Tigers are a Norwegian ice hockey club based in Asker. They are members of the highest Norwegian ice hockey league, Eliteserien (known as GET-ligaen for sponsorship reasons). The Tigers are the ice hockey department of IF Frisk Asker, a sports club founded in 1922. In 1935, the club began playing ice hockey, joining the newly established Norwegian Ice Hockey Association as its twelfth member. The "Tigers" nickname is a recent addition, used in recognition of IK Tigrene with whom Frisk had merged in 1969. As of 2010, they have completed forty-three seasons in the Eliteserien and have won 684 regular season games and five league titles.

Having spent their early years in the second level B-serien, Frisk briefly played in the top flight, then known as 1. divisjon, for a few seasons following World War II. For the most part, however, their achievements remained modest until the construction of the indoor ice rink Askerhallen in 1969. This attracted the attention of Tigrene, an Oslo-based club who had a strong team but nowhere to play, and the two clubs agreed to a merger. Frisk thus gained entry into the highest division for the first time in twenty years and were one of the leading teams in Norway during the 1970s, winning the Norwegian Championship twice. The club's fortunes then began to fade until reaching a low point in 1994, when they spent one season playing in the second tier. The Tigers have since enjoyed another period of success, making three appearances in the Finals during the 2000s and adding a third Norwegian Championship title in 2002.

Seasons

Notes
Code explanation; GP—Games Played, W—Wins, L—Losses, T—Tied games, OTW—Overtime/Shootout wins, OTL—Overtime/Shootout losses, GF—Goals For, GA—Goals Against, Pts—Points
Before the 1955–56 season, the top division, 1. divisjon was renamed Hovedserien. Correspondingly, the 2. divisjon (second tier) was renamed 1. divisjon, the 3. divisjon (third tier) was renamed 2. divisjon etc.
Before the 1963–64 season, the top division, Hovedserien was renamed 1. divisjon. Correspondingly, the 1. divisjon (second tier)  was renamed 2. divisjon, the 2. divisjon (third tier) was renamed 3. divisjon etc.
Before the 1990–91 season, the top division, 1. divisjon was renamed Eliteserien. Correspondingly, the 2. divisjon (second tier) was renamed 1. divisjon, the 3. divisjon (third tier) was renamed 2. divisjon etc.
Between the 1990–91 season and the 1993–94 season, the Eliteserien was divided into two parts. After the first 18 games, the top eight teams qualified for the second half of the Eliteserien. The bottom two teams were relegated to the 1. divisjon and would compete for the right to play in the Eliteserien in the following season. In 1990–91, the results of both rounds were added up to produce one league champion; in the three following seasons, there were two champions per season.
Frisk were promoted despite finishing fourth and last. Runners-up Sparta went bankrupt and withdrew from the league. Their place was offered to third placed Lørenskog, who declined, and then to Frisk, who accepted.
Beginning with the 2002–03 season, all games in the Eliteserien have a winner. In addition, teams now receive three points for a win in regulation time, two points for a win in overtime and one point for a loss in overtime.
Totals as of the completion of the 2009–10 season, except for 1945–46 season.

References

Frisk Tigers seasons, List of
Frisk Asker Ishockey